Brigitte Jordan was a German-American professor, scientist, and consultant who was described as the midwife to the "Anthropology of Birth". She attended Sacramento State College where she received her bachelor's and master's degrees, and later attended the University of California, Irvine where she completed her PhD.

Early life and education
Brigitte "Gitti" Jordan was born in Passau, Germany, in 1937. Her parents were Gertrude Frank Muller, who died in 1944 when Jordan was seven, and Josef Karl Muller.

Jordan earned her B.A. and M.A. degrees in anthropology at California State University at Sacramento, and her Ph.D. in social science/anthropology from University of California at Irvine in 1975.

Career and later life

Jordan spent much of her early career studying obstetrical anthropology and cross-cultural birth practices.  Rayna Rapp praised Jordan for her authoritative knowledge of childbirth: "Jordan uses her exquisite sense of description to birth a theoretical framework." Jordan's theoretical concept of authoritative knowledge has been employed by countless scholars to account for the subsuming of some ways of knowing by others and also to show how knowledge can be laterally distributed.

In 1988, Jordan began working as a corporate anthropologist, and her research and consulting interests evolved to include the changing nature of work under the impact of new communication and information technologies and the consequent transformation of ways of life, societal institutions, and global economies.

Jordan later opened her own consulting practice where she held appointments as the Principal Scientist at the Xerox Palo Alto Research Center and as Senior Research Scientist at the Institute for Research on Learning. This led to her receiving the Excellence in Science and Technology Award from the Xerox Corporation for innovative work.

Jordan's research on the relationship between humans and technology has influenced organizations outside of the field of anthropology, such as the Special Interest Group on Computer-Human Interaction (SIGCHI). She is also credited with the development of corporate anthropology.

Personal life 
After marrying Richard Jordan, an American soldier stationed in Germany, in 1958, Jordan came to the United States. There, she gave birth to three children: Wayne, Susan, and Kimsey. The couple divorced in 1968 and Jordan and married Robert Irwin.

Later life and death 
Jordan died of pancreatic cancer in her home on May 24, 2016. She lived to be 78, leaving behind her husband, three children, six grandchildren, and two great-grandchildren. Although Jordan had pancreatic cancer, she made it known to others that she did not want to be treated as incapable because of her condition. She refused medication and remained mentally and intellectually active until the end of her life. She continued to live life in a normalized manner, and helped form her obituary.

Career honors
Jordan received the Margaret Mead Award in 1980 for her 1978 book Birth in Four Cultures: A Crosscultural Investigation of Childbirth in Yucatan, Holland, Sweden, and the United States. Her work is credited with inspiring a range of responses within the field of reproductive anthropology that integrated her approaches to her examinations of the social, cultural and biological implications of birth around the world. She is known for showing how knowledge can be "laterally distributed," shared by all, and understood by all.

In 2015, Jordan was inducted into the American Anthropological Association's (AAA) Distinguished Member program which honors members who have loyally supported the Association for 50 years or more.

Works 

 Die Bedeutung der Fernröntgen-Profil-Aufnahme für die Indikation der kieferorthopädischen Extraktionstherapie (1966) [in German]
 Untersuchung zur einfachen radioimmunologischen Testosteronbestimmung mit einer Kieselgelmikrosäule (1977) [in German]
 Birth in Four Cultures: A Crosscultural Investigation of Childbirth in Yucatan, Holland, Sweden, and the United States (1978) Montreal: Eden Press Women's Publications
 Technology Transfer in Obstetrics: Theory and Practice in Developing Countries (1986) East Lansing, MI: Michigan State University
 Modes of Teaching and Learning: Questions Raised by the Training of Traditional Birth Attendants (1987) Palo Alto, Calif.: Institute for Research on Learning
 Knowing by Doing: Lessons Traditional Midwives Taught Me (1988) East Lansing, MI: Michigan State University
 Successful Home Birth and Midwifery: The Dutch Model (1993) Westport, Conn.: Bergin & Garvey
 Advancing Ethnography in Corporate Environments: Challenges and Emerging Opportunities (2012) Walnut Creek, CA: Left Coast

References

External links 

 Brigitte Jordan papers at the Sophia Smith Collection, Smith College Special Collections

1938 births
2016 deaths
American anthropologists
American women scientists
American women writers
California State University, Sacramento alumni
German emigrants to the United States
University of California, Irvine alumni
Xerox people
21st-century American women